Elaphidion is a genus of beetles in the family Cerambycidae, containing the following species:

 Elaphidion albosignatum Chevrolat, 1862
 Elaphidion androsensis Fisher, 1942
 Elaphidion angustatum Zayas, 1975
 Elaphidion auricoma Lingafelter, 2008
 Elaphidion bahamicae Cazier & Lacey, 1952
 Elaphidion bidens (Fabricius, 1787)
 Elaphidion cayamae Fisher, 1932
 Elaphidion clavis Linsley, 1957
 Elaphidion conspersum Newman, 1841
 Elaphidion costipenne Fisher, 1932
 Elaphidion cristalensis Zayas, 1975
 Elaphidion cryptum Linsley, 1963
 Elaphidion cubae Fisher, 1932
 Elaphidion curacaoae Gilmour, 1968
 Elaphidion densevestitum Fisher, 1942
 Elaphidion depressum Zayas, 1975
 Elaphidion difflatus Zayas, 1975
 Elaphidion elongatum Fisher, 1942
 Elaphidion excelsum Gahan, 1895
 Elaphidion frisevestitum Fisher, 1942
 Elaphidion fullonium Newman, 1841
 Elaphidion glabratum (Fabricius, 1775)
 Elaphidion glabriusculum (Bates, 1885)
 Elaphidion inclusum Vitali, 2007
 Elaphidion irroratum (Linnaeus, 1767)
 Elaphidion iviei Lingafelter, 2008
 Elaphidion jamaicensis Fisher, 1932
 Elaphidion jibacoense Zayas, 1975
 Elaphidion knulli Linsley, 1957
 Elaphidion laeve White, 1853
 Elaphidion lanatum Chevrolat, 1862
 Elaphidion lewisi Fisher, 1941
 Elaphidion linsleyi Knull, 1960
 Elaphidion manni Fisher, 1932
 Elaphidion mayesae Ivie, 2007
 Elaphidion michelii Ivie, 2007
 Elaphidion mimeticum Schaeffer, 1905
 Elaphidion mucronatum (Say, 1824)
 Elaphidion nearnsi Lingafelter, 2008
 Elaphidion niveonotatum Zayas, 1975
 Elaphidion pauropilosum Zayas, 1975
 Elaphidion pseudonomon Ivie, 1985
 Elaphidion pusillum Haldeman, 1847
 Elaphidion quadrituberculatum Chevrolat, 1862
 Elaphidion rotundipenne Fisher, 1932
 Elaphidion scabricolle (Bates, 1872)
 Elaphidion scaramuzzai Fisher, 1951
 Elaphidion spinicorne (Drury, 1773)
 Elaphidion splendidum Fisher, 1932
 Elaphidion tectum LeConte in Schwarz, 1878
 Elaphidion thompsoni Fisher, 1941
 Elaphidion tocanum Vitali, 2009
 Elaphidion tomentosum Chevrolat, 1862
 Elaphidion tuberculicolle Fisher, 1932
 Elaphidion uncinatum Zayas, 1975
 Elaphidion unispinosum Fisher, 1942
 Elaphidion wappesi Lingafelter, 2008
 Elaphidion williamsi Chemsak, 1967

References

 
Cerambycidae genera
Elaphidiini